Lev Mikhailovich Khinchuk (16 November 1868, Poltava – 14 March 1944) was originally a member of the Menshevik faction of the Russian Social Democratic Labour Party  (RSDLP) until 1919, when he applied for membership of the Russian Communist Party (Bolshevik). He was elected a member of the executive committee of the Saint Petersburg Soviet during the 1905 Russian Revolution. Following its defeat he was voted onto the executive committee of the 4th Central Committee of the RSDLP.

References

1868 births
1944 deaths
Mensheviks
Bolsheviks